Aleardo Donati (8 March 1904 – 29 December 1990) was an Italian wrestler. He competed at the 1924, 1928, 1932 and the 1936 Summer Olympics. He also won 19 national championships from 1922 to 1942.

References

External links
 

1904 births
1990 deaths
Olympic wrestlers of Italy
Wrestlers at the 1924 Summer Olympics
Wrestlers at the 1928 Summer Olympics
Wrestlers at the 1932 Summer Olympics
Wrestlers at the 1936 Summer Olympics
Italian male sport wrestlers
Sportspeople from Bologna
20th-century Italian people